The Frisch elasticity of labor supply captures the elasticity of hours worked to the wage rate, given a constant marginal utility of wealth. Marginal utility is constant for risk-neutral individuals according to microeconomics. In other words, the Frisch elasticity measures the substitution effect of a change in the wage rate on labor supply. This concept was proposed by the economist Ragnar Frisch after whom the elasticity of labor supply is named.

The value of the Frisch elasticity is interpreted as willingness to work when wage is changed. The higher the Frisch elasticity, the more willing are people to work if the wage increases.

The Frisch elasticity can be also referred to as “λ-constant” elasticity, where λ denotes marginal utility of wealth, or also in some macro literature it is referred to as “macro elasticity” as macroeconomic models are set in terms of the Frisch elasticity, while the term “micro elasticity” is used to refer to the intensive margin elasticity of hours conditional on employment.

The Frisch elasticity of labor supply is important for economic analysis and for understanding business cycle fluctuations. It also controls intertemporal substitution responses to fluctuations of wage. Moreover, it determines the reaction of effects to fiscal policy interventions, taxation or money transfers.

Let's denote the Frisch elasticity as FE. Then .

This is formula for overall Frisch elasticity, where h and w denote hours of work and wage, respectively.

The overall effect of the Frisch elasticity, however, can be distinguished into extensive and intensive. The extensive effect can be explained as a decision whether to work at all. The intensive effect refers to a decision of an employee on the number of hours to work.

Under certain circumstances, a constant marginal utility of wealth implies a constant marginal utility of consumption. Also the Frisch elasticity corresponds to the elasticity of substitution of labor supply.

The Hidden Unemployed 

Calculations done by the BLS have shown that unemployment is in measurements often different depending on the current definition of what it means to be unemployed. Being on temporary layoff is one of the conditions for someone to be considered unemployed. The second option for a person to be considered unemployed is to state that he or she has been looking actively for a job in the past four weeks. “Out of labor force” is someone who does not fulfill previously mentioned criteria and is therefore not considered to be unemployed. Also, be aware that some people are presenting themselves as actively looking for a job even though they have in reality no willingness to work at all. By this act, they want to obtain the benefits of being unemployed. This, as you can see, leads to unemployment statistics being different from each other. The 2009 harsh recession has become the main theme of BLS statistics, in which/During the 2009 harsh recession, for example, it is often claimed that the statistical unemployment rate (BLS statistic) underestimates the reality of severe recession and tough economic obstacles. The difficulties that had to be faced by unemployed people when they were trying to find a job were simply for someone to great to overcome. This resulted in many people dropping off their willingness to find a job and thus leaving the labour market along with losing the status of unemployed. Some may insist that these people considered hidden unemployed should be included in the overall statistics of unemployed people in order to show that the problem of unemployment is much worse than the BLS data indicated. Another way of measuring the aggregate economic activity is the employment rate. This function shows us the current part of the population with a job. However, it combines people who claim to be unemployed with those who are identified as being out of the labor force. Even though the second group has some hidden unemployed insight, it also consists of people with rather little tendency to work, such as retirees, women with small children and students enrolled in school. Reduction in the employment could be caused by higher unemployment or by unassociated extension in fertility or school enrollment rates. We can assume that for the purpose of measuring the fluctuations in economic activity, it is in reality better to use employment rate rather than the unemployment rate.

Budget constraint 

Meaning that, the money value of costs on goods (C) must equal the total of wage (wh) and nonlabor income (V). The rate of wage is essential when it comes to choosing labor supply. Now lets think that the wage rate is constant for a person, who is unable to change his hourly wage according to his time spent at work. Additionally we will define the “marginal” wage as money earned for the last hour worked. This, of course, depends on the number of hours which are spent working. Someone who works more than 40 hours per week usually gets more money as an overtime premium. Also the wage of part-time jobs tends to be inferior to the wage of full-time jobs. Now, let's also not include the possibility that someone's marginal wage is related to the number of hours spent working. With the condition of a constant wage rate, we can put the budget constraint into a graph. Work or leisure are the only options someone has when it comes to choosing the way of spending his/her time. Time given to either work or leisure will then be similar to the time in the overall period. We will denote it as T hours in a week, so that T = h + L

The equation of a budget constraint can also be written as

C = w(T -L) + V

or
 
C = (wT + V) – wL
 
The last equation is formed by a line, and the inclination is the negative of the wage rate (-w). Even if the person spends the whole time (T) working or at leisure, it is still available for him to buy consumption goods at the price of V. Giving up one hour of leisure would result in moving up the budget line and thus being able to buy additional w dollars of goods. Of course, this effect is relevant every time the person is willing to exchange an hour of leisure for an hour of work, resulting in the ability to buy additional w dollars of goods. Meaning that, every hour of leisure has some cost and the cost is dependent on the wage rate. By giving up all the free time activities, the person gets to the interface of the budget line and can buy (wT + V) worth of goods. Additionally, the worker has access to all the combinations on the budget line and thus creating worker's opportunity set ( set of all the baskets of consumption that the worker is able to purchase.)

See also 
 King–Plosser–Rebelo preferences

References 

 
 
 
 
 

Welfare economics
Labour economics
Elasticity (economics)
Utility